Christophe Rinero (born 29 December 1973 in Moissac) is a former French professional road racing cyclist. His sporting career began with CA Castelsarrazin. Rinero's greatest achievements have been to win the Tour de l'Avenir in 1998 and the King of the Mountains in the 1998 Tour de France. In 2002, he won stage 2 at Tour du Limousin. He retired at the end of 2008

Major results

1996
3rd Overall Tour de l'Ain
1st Stage 1
1998
 1st  Overall Tour de l'Avenir
1st Stages 7 & 9
 1st Stage 1 Tour du Limousin
2nd Overall Grand Prix du Midi Libre
1st Stage 2
3rd Châteauroux Classic
4th Overall Tour de France
1st  Mountains classification
6th GP Ouest–France
8th Route Adélie
2002
Tour du Limousin
1st Mountains classification
1st Stage 2
3rd Boucles de l'Aulne
8th Overall Tour de Picardie
2003
3rd Overall Tour de la Somme
5th Grand Prix de Wallonie
2004
8th Grand Prix de Wallonie
2005
2nd Overall Criterium des Espoirs
6th Grand Prix de Wallonie
7th GP de la Ville de Rennes
2008
10th Overall Rhône-Alpes Isère Tour

External links
Profile at Saunier Duval-Prodir official website

References 

1973 births
Living people
French male cyclists
Sportspeople from Tarn-et-Garonne
Cyclists from Occitania (administrative region)